, also known as Prince of Darkness Nadesico or Nadesico the Movie: Prince of Darkness, is a 1998 anime film written and directed by Tatsuo Satō, and it is a sequel to the series Martian Successor Nadesico. The story is a direct sequel to Nadesico: The Blank of Three Years, a video game for the Sega Saturn that takes place immediately after the TV series ends, and before the movie begins. The movie won the prestigious Seiun Award for Best Dramatic Presentation, Prince of Darkness also win Anime Grand Prix from Animage magazine for Best Title, Best Female character (Ruri Hoshino), and Best Song ("Dearest" by Yumi Matsuzawa), and It was a nominated for the Animation Kobe for Theatrical Film Award but lost to Pokémon: The First Movie (which later won Stinkers Bad Movie Awards for Worst Achievement in Animation). Originally licensed by ADV Films, the movie, along with the TV Series have been re-licensed to Nozomi Entertainment.

Plot
Two years have passed since the third battle of Mars, with the Nadesico taking possession of the Ruin. The Earth and the Jovian Federation have come to an uneasy peace. However, Akito and Yurika have both vanished and are presumed dead. Meanwhile, a new threat to peace is rising in the form of the "Martian Successors" (A splinter group of the original Jovian Federation who wish to continue the war and take revenge on the Earth and Nergal and bring about a new world order). A 15-year-old Ruri Hoshino, is now the new captain of the highly-mobile battleship Nadesico B, and has earned the respect and awe of many in the Military thanks to her unparalleled skill with machines, made her gains the nickname "Cyber Fairy".

Most of the original Nadesico crew return in order to prevent the Earth from experiencing another war. Some of the crew have undergone slight changes; the Aestivalis pilot Ryoko now sports her naturally black hair color, but others (such as the pun-loving Izumi) have not changed at all. Two new crew members from Nadesico B join the original Nadesico crew, the first is a young boy named Ensign Hari Makibi, who like Ruri is a genetically engineered prodigy and has exceptional control over machines. The second is Saburota Takasugi, a former member of the Jovian Federation Defense Force who now serves as the Nadesico B's Tactical Officer, unlike other Jovian's who are generally chivalrous and very respectful of women, Saburota is something of a womanizer.

While at Akito's Grave (it had been two years since Akito's disappearance) Ruri discovers that Akito is still alive. Akito explains that he and Yurika had been captured, while conducting Boson Jumping experiments by the Martian Successors. Akito had been tortured, his brain severely effected to the point of not being able to taste anything (thus being unable to cook) and his skin shining white like a comic book.

Akito gives Ruri his recipe for Ramen Noodles as a way to remember the person he used to be.
Akito leaves after fighting the Martian Successors and obtains a high powered battleship from Nergal in order to go to Mars and Rescue Yurika, The Nadesico C also heads to Mars intent on arresting the Martian Successors.
After fighting and killing the Martian Successors leader Akito is able to rescue Yurika,  meanwhile after taking control of all the Martian Successors' computers, Ruri is able to disable their weapons and force the Successors to surrender.
Following their victory Akito departs, not wanting Yurika (who was regaining her consciousness) or anyone else to see how he has changed.
When asked by Ryoko if they should go after Akito, Ruri says that Akito will return eventually and if he doesn't then she would go and find him personally because Akito was an important person to them all.

Companion game
Nadesico: The Blank of Three Years, a video game for the Sega Saturn, was released September 23, 1998, one month after Prince of Darkness hit theaters. The game takes place immediately after the TV series ends, and before the movie begins, filling in on details that leads up to the plot of the movie. However, the game was never translated and released outside Japan.

Characters

Crew of the Nadesico-B

Lieutenant Commander Ruri Hoshino - now sixteen, Ruri is the captain of the Nadesico-B and idolised by much of the military as the Electronic Fairy. She is glad to see Akito is still alive, but hurt to see how much he's changed. She views new crewmate Hari (a product, like her, of genetic engineering) as a younger brother.
Ensign Hari Makibi (Noriko Hidaka) - a bridge officer aboard the Nadesico-B (and the only major new cast member), Hari is a genetically engineered genius with abilities similar to Ruri's; but unlike her, he's very emotional. He is jealous of her relationship to the first Nadesico crew.
Saburota Takasugi (Shin-ichiro Miki)- previously seen as an officer in the Jovian Federation, Saburota is now a First Lieutenant in the UESF, and serves as Ruri's Tactical Officer. He has dyed his hair blond.

Other members of the Unified Forces
Commander Jun Aoi - now captain of his own ship (the UESF 3rd Fleet battleship Amaryllis), Jun has grown but is still completely overwhelmed by the personalities around him. In particular, he is bullied by Yukina into letting her join the Nadesico-C's mission.

Former crew of the Nadesico
Ryoko Subaru - ace Aestivalis pilot, Ryoko now sports her natural black hair instead of green. She is one of the first to learn of Yurika's fate and is enraged that she is unable to rescue her right away. Still fond of Akito, she is teased by her fellows Izumi and Hikaru about her interactions with Saburota.
Izumi Maki - Izumi is the hostess of a bar when Mr. Prospector arrives to recruit her.
Hikaru Amano - Aestivalis pilot and rabid Gekigangar III fangirl, Hikaru has become a somewhat overstressed manga artist. Before agreeing to join the Nadesico-C, she convinces Ruri & Co. to help her finish an issue before her deadline.

Those with secret fates
Akito Tenkawa - thought to be dead, Akito proves to be the Prince of Darkness of the title.  One of many Class A Jumpers abducted by the Martian Successors, he was subjected to experiments that have damaged his body, destroyed his sense of taste (a terrible fate for a cook), and hardened his personality; he has no compunction about killing those who block his mission to rescue Yurika.
Lapis Lazuli (Yukie Nakama) - A young girl with long, ice-blue hair. Lapis is another product of Nergal's labs, created with the hopes of re-creating the success of Ruri Hoshino, and is part of the One-Man, One-Ship Project. When the Martian Successors betrayed Nergal, Lapis was among those abducted and was experimented on. The experiments ended up destroying her ability to feel emotions. Lapis was later rescued during a rescue operation conducted by Nergal, and given the Nergal-designed Corvette Eucharis, which she controls entirely on her own. Lapis later becomes partnered with Akito, and together, supplements their destroyed senses. (Her name refers to the blue gem, lapis lazuli.)
Yurika Misumaru - also thought killed during jumping trials, Yurika was another abductee.  The Martian Successors have fused her with the Ruin that controls all Boson Jumps, giving them an unprecedented level of control.  Her rescue is the key objective of both Akito and the Nadesico-C's mission.
Inez Fressange - generally believed to be dead, Inez was actually hidden as a Nergal subterfuge when the abduction of Class A Jumpers became apparent.  She rejoins when the Nadesico-C is launched, and is key to jumping it to the final confrontation on Mars.

The Martian Successors
Jovian Vice-Admiral Haruki Kusakabe - de facto leader of the Jovians during the war, Kusakabe vanished afterward and infiltrated himself and his so-called "Martian Successors" into the Hisago Plan.  He and his scientists retrieved the Ruin, intercepted Class A Jumpers during transit, and planned to solidify their position with a monopoly on precision boson jumping.
Hokushin- A mysterious assassin hired by the Martian Successors to eliminate any high level threats to Kusakabe. It is insinuated that the assassin was responsible for Akito's condition and is obsessed with torturing him. He is a potent bosun jumper and is a master of Martain Swordsmenship. His personal combat unit, the Yatenko, enables to use bosun jumps at will

References

External links
 
 Animerica preview/review

Japanese animated science fiction films
1998 anime films
ADV Films
Animated films based on animated series
Martian Successor Nadesico
Mecha anime and manga
Production I.G
Xebec (studio)
Films scored by Takayuki Hattori